Lamba people are a Bantu ethnolinguistic group mainly located in the Central, Copperbelt, and North-Western provinces of Zambia. Lamba people speak the Lamba language, with Lamba and Lima the major dialects recognized.

Etymology 
Lamba is ‘the act of humbling oneself’. Lambas are generally very humble people in nature.

History 
Before colonial history in the late nineteenth century, there is little information related to Lambas. Portuguese explorer Francisco de Lacerda first mentioned the Lambas, in his journal entry on 21 September 1798, recounting that Lambas were trading copper and ivory to Chief Kazembe's Lunda, and the middlemen of Nsenga country near Zumbo, the Portuguese trading post on the Zambezi.

According to Clement M. Doke, the Lamba kingdom (chiefdom) is estimated to have been established in the 16th century, between 1585 – 1889. The founder of the tribe is believed to have been a woman known as Chembo Kasako Chimbala. She was the youngest wife of the Great King Mwati Yamvwa of the Luba-Lunda kingdom; she did not accept being part of a polygamous marriage, so she fled with her son Chembo and settled in what is today known as: Lambaland (Ilana) on the Copperbelt at Nkashiba Kabena Mofya (Lake of the Mofya clan), commonly known as St Anthony because the Catholics built a church there. The Kingdom grew and spread into the southern  Democratic Republic of Congo (DRC) in Katanga Province, a province equally rich in copper. Therefore, whether you are in Zambia or in DRC, the copperbelt of both countries is squarely Lambaland (Ilamba).

From the time the Lambas migrated to the Lambaland or Ilamba they never had a chief up to the time of Chimpipi who came from the Yeke Kingdom, together with his sister and son whose name was Kabunda. From the time of migration Lamba used to feed on wild fruits and honey. But the coming of Chimpipi in the Lambaland the crop cultivation and harvesting was introduced, and for that reason Lambas decided to make Chimpipi their Chief, and he was succeeded by his son Kabunda.

There are 15 Lamba chiefs in the copper belt of Zambia and 8 chiefs in the Katanga province of the DRC, and they are as follows;  Senior Chief Mushili who has been designed as Senior Chief but to the Lambas at all levels both in Zambia and DRC Mushili is a paramount chief of all Lambas. The name Mushili means the endless land or mother earth. Chief Lesa, chief Selenje, Senior Chief Kalilele in north western province Mushingano District, Chief Nkambo, Chief Mukutuma, Chief Shibuchinga, Senior Chief Chiwala, Senior Chief Nkana Kitwe, Mufulira and Kalulushi, Chief Shibuchinga, Chief Ndubeni, Chief Lumpuma, Chief Malembeka, Chief Kalunkumya, Chief Fungulwa and Chief Machiya.

In the DRC Chief Saili (Lumbembe), Chief Katala (Mokambo), Chief Mfundamina (Mfundamina), Chief Kombo (Kombo), Chief Katanga (Lubumbashi) of interest to note is the fact that even the name of the province is taken from Chief Katanga a Lamba Chief. Chief Sakania (Sakania), Chief Kaponda (Kolwezi), and lastly Chief Nshindaika (Likasi). There are altogether 23 Lamba Chiefs in both provinces making up the Lambaland or Ilamba.

The rivers of the Lambaland are the Lweenge River as it is called right from its source by the Lamba people in the North western province of Zambia in the Mushindano District. And as the River enters the Copper belt it is called Ulufubu, and in the Southern province it is called Kafuwa (Kafue). The Kafulafuta River which like the Lufubu/Kafue has its source in the DRC and it is a tributary of the Kafue River. The Luswishi River the only River which has the source in the copper belt and it ends in the copper belt. The smaller is the Kafubu river and others.

The mining actitivities was started long before the coming of the whites and this is confirmed with the mining sites in Bwana Mukubwa near Ndola the provincial capital  for the Lamba people.

Social organization 
Lamba society is matrilineal. They use slash-and-burn farming methods and dwell in small, dispersed villages. In the last three hundred years, they have maintained close relationships with related neighbors, living, trading, marrying, and visiting across the Zambezi-Zaire watershed.

The tribe brothers to the Lambas are the Kaondes of the North Western province as the two tribes share a lot of things in common. The traditions and the culture, the drum beat and the dance, the Kaonge dance, the Shinongo dance and the Matyatya dance. The Luvales of the North Western province are the Lambas traditional cousins so are the Lundas. On the Western province the Lambas do the cousinship with all tribes of Western province.

‘The people are divided into a number of exogamous clans and clan descent is matrilineal. The Lambas may be described as hunting agriculturists. Physically, they are of medium built and remarkably robust and strong. Linguistically, the Lambas belong to the Central Bantu Group of which ubulamba is a typical example. Their language is remarkably rich in folklore and proverbs they take great delight in talking. Practically every Lamba is a born orator, unafraid to voice his views, no matter what size the assembly may be’.

In the past, the chief had the power of life and death and in certain circumstances, the chief would order someone to be jailed, executed, or be sold into slavery and that was without doubt. That authority was inherited and over time, has been enshrined in all of the people who have grown up in that culture. Despite many years of urbanization, the Lambas still maintain their culture and traditions. However to understand their practices, one must analyze them through the lenses of the Lambas themselves.

As early as 1931, Doke had the following confession to make about the Lambas:
…understand better the people and their point of view…this is a record of the thoughts and lives of the people as far I can observe them, unaffected by Christianizing and the influence of Western civilization….I can only say that I wish I had more knowledge of the significance of the native customs when I first went to work among the Lambas. I should have been saved from many grievous mistakes and many misjudgments. The ability to see through the Bantu eyes will give the missionary and the officials’ better understanding and more sympathy with the people, and a greater ability to gain their confidence.

See also
Lamba language
Bemba people

References

Sources
Doke, Clement M. The Lambas of Northern Rhodesia: A Study of their Customs and Beliefs. London: George G. Harrap, 1931

Ethnic groups in Zambia
Ethnic groups in the Democratic Republic of the Congo